Clear Convictions is a Christian metal band from Ponce, Puerto Rico, formerly known as Inmortales.  The band formed in 1999, released their debut album, Warning, in 2004, their second album, Mystery of Inquiry, in 2008, their debut EP, A Past That Attempts To Define Me, in 2013, and their second EP, New Seasons, in 2015. The band has played with Inked in Blood, xLooking Forwardx, No Innocent Victim, Figure Four, and Seventh Star. The band announced that they had disbanded on December 31, 2016.

Name
The band stated in an interview: "'Clear Convictions' comes around because that's how we see our lifestyle. As Christians, we believe by faith and that faith becomes true and alive , something that you can feel inside,it is like having an ear and true relationship with the Creator. Then that faith madeus move in obedience to God, for example that made us to: Love the people around as ourselves, love our enemy, protect the weak etc.To obey God's will. Then we are CLEAR that our CONVICTIONS are that we have a God that lives and has the power and is the only one that can change death to life because we feel and see Him in our lives. In other words: Clear Convictions = Believe in God in a time of God Free. Oh and, it sounds cool, the other name that we had wasn’t."

Members
Current
 Daniel Maldonado - guitar (1999-2016, 2019-present)
 Carlos Perez - guitars, backing vocals (2013-2016, 2019-present)
 Tim Pitsenbarger - drums
 Jesus Tossas - bass

Former
 Jerameel Lugo - guitar, bass
 Luis "Welchi" - bass
 Enzo Medina - drums
Natanael Maldonado - vocals
Tony Rosario - vocals (2014-2015)

Discography
Demos
 Clear Convictions (2003)

EPs
 New Seasons (2015, Unsigned)

Studio albums
 Warning (2006, Strike First)
 Mystery of Iniquity (2008, On The Attack, Blood & Ink)
 A Past That Attempts to Define Me (2013, Unsigned)
 Endure (2020)

References

External links
Clear Convictions on HM Magazine

Musical quartets
American metalcore musical groups
Musical groups established in 1999
American Christian metal musical groups
Strike First Records artists
OnTheAttack Records artists
Blood and Ink Records artists
1999 establishments in Puerto Rico